"Paradise" is a song by the British rock band Coldplay, released on 12 September 2011 as the second single from their fifth album, Mylo Xyloto. The song received its radio debut at 7:50 a.m. on The Chris Moyles Show (BBC Radio 1) on 12 September 2011. According to Coldplay's official website, the single was not initially chart eligible in the United Kingdom, because it was available on iTunes as an "instant grat" (immediate download) when pre-ordering the album. Following the release of the album on 30 October 2011, the song became chart eligible in the UK and entered the UK Singles Chart at number 14, before taking the number 1 spot on its tenth week, becoming the band's second number-one single after "Viva la Vida" in 2008. The song was met with positive reviews, and was the best selling rock song of 2011 in the United Kingdom, selling 410,000 copies.

On 30 November, the song was nominated for a Grammy Award, in the category Best Pop Duo/Group Performance. On 12 February 2012, Coldplay performed "Paradise" live at the RE, along with "Princess of China". At the 2012 MTV Video Music Awards on 6 September, the song won the award for Best Rock Video. Following the 2012 Stanley Cup playoffs on CBC, the song was featured in a yearly finale montage on CBC recapping the Stanley Cup Playoffs as well as British and American television advertisements and trailers for the film Life of Pi, which was nominated for eleven Academy Awards.

Background and composition
In 2010, the producers of ITV reality show The X Factor originally approached singer Chris Martin to write a winner's song for the seventh series of the show in 2010. "Paradise" was originally conceived by Martin as a response to the show's request, but drummer Will Champion insisted that the song be included on Mylo Xyloto.

Chris Martin's vocals range from A3 to A5.

Critical reception
The song was met with positive reviews from the majority of music critics. Billboard gave a positive review calling the track "another slice of hug-warm ecstasy" and gave praise to the "boiling strings, rattling synthesizers, and bass-heavy-beats" saying "it shows they know how to bring a few new tricks to the table". Both Q and Rolling Stone offered similar praise, and also noted that it was another step in the right direction. Altsounds.com gave a similar review remarking that there are "Drums that you would expect in a Rihanna song and melodies you would expect from a band like Friendly Fires and the "oohs" from 3OH!3 is what you first hear. That is, of course, until Chris Martin's vocals come into play and there is no doubt in your mind that this is Coldplay. A wonderful chorus of "para-para-paradise" reminds you just how good they really are. It will remain with you for weeks to come, like that new piece of clothing you just can't get enough of".

About.com said, in a three-and-a-half star review, that "even when Coldplay sound a bit like they are spinning their wheels musically, it can still have quite beautiful moments." The review called the opening fanfare "simply gorgeous" but felt the rest of the song did not hold up as well as it could have. NME gave a more mixed reaction to the song and felt that "It's hard to say what the band is aiming for with the song. To replicate the epic football stadium 'moment' of 'Yellow'? The energy of a 'Viva La Vida'? If so it doesn't quite work on either count" but continued "if you're going to have a mid-paced Coldplay-by-numbers single-single, you may as well have one as grand and gorgeous as 'Paradise'." Rolling Stone ranked the song at number 41 on their "50 Best Singles of 2011" list. In 2013, MTV Australia included "Paradise" on their unranked list of the "Top 1000 All Time Classics". The song was later part of Q's unranked "Songs of the Decade" editorial in 2019.

Chart performance
"Paradise" became a top five hit in 16 countries. In the United States it peaked at number 15 on the Billboard Hot 100. Following the release on 12 September 2011, "Paradise" was revealed chart ineligible in the United Kingdom, having been offered as an "instant grat" (immediate download) for anyone who pre-ordered the album, Mylo Xyloto. The release of the album on 24 October 2011 saw "Paradise" debut at number 14 on the UK Singles Chart with sales of 27,277 copies (the track had a total of 118,547 downloads in the six weeks of chart ineligibility). After being made purchasable at 59p (instead of 99p) on the UK's iTunes Store and being played on the X Factor final, "Paradise" regained momentum in the UK and climbed up to number two on 18 December 2011. On 1 January 2012, almost four months after its release, "Paradise" peaked at number one becoming the first number-one single of 2012 in the UK and becoming Coldplay's second UK number-one single after "Viva la Vida" in 2008. "Paradise" was the biggest-selling rock single of 2011 in the UK, with sales of 410,000 copies. It has sold 1,200,000 copies in the UK as of April 2017.

Live performances
"Paradise" was first ever played live before an audience on the night of 9 September 2011: it was shot before the studio audience of the Parisian music TV show Taratata on French television France 2. The crowd's response of this first performance was described as "unmistakable" by one of the band's roadies. The show was only broadcast later, in October 2011. 
The song was first played for a big audience at the Austin City Limits Taping event on 15 September 2011 and then on the following day at the Austin City Limits Festival when it was for the first time officially broadcast live.

Coldplay performed the song on the finale of The X Factor, as well as an episode of Saturday Night Live in which the band was the musical guest. On 28 October, the band performed the song before a studio audience on The Ellen DeGeneres Show.

"Paradise" became the anthem for the 2012 Summer Paralympics and was played twice during the closing ceremony, the latter performance featuring rapper Jay Z.

Music videos

Coldplay initially announced that the single's music video would be directed by Hype Williams, but that version was scrapped after shooting and the band decided instead to record a new version directed by long-time collaborator Mat Whitecross. The band called Whitecross just a day before the shooting and the video's concept was finished just hours before the director travelled from London to South Africa. Chris Martin created the video's concept storyline, which was ultimately filmed in the style of a nature documentary. Due to a combination of time constraints in shooting the video and Martin's conceptualization, the elephant suits were intendedly "lo-fi and spontaneous", and the unicycle had to be found in a hurry. The video was released on YouTube on 18 October 2011.

In the video, Chris Martin, dressed as an elephant, escapes from the zoo. He finds an abandoned sharing system bicycle, rides it to Belsize Park London Underground station, and takes the train to Heathrow Airport in an attempt to hitch-hike his way to another country, doing so finally by stowing away inside a suitcase. An aerial shot reveals that his initial destination was Cape Town, South Africa. He is then seen wandering around Johannesburg at one point, walking past Nelson Mandela Bridge and a set of railway tracks in Braamfontein. He then earns enough money, which appears to be ZAR 67.05 (roughly equivalent to GBP 5.34 or US$8.40), by busking on the street, which shows portions of the song's lyrics in sync, to buy a bike; the shopkeeper suggests a unicycle instead. After a seemingly hopeless wander on his new unicycle (in which Martin takes off his elephant head for a second), he comes across three other elephants, who are the rest of Coldplay, playing the song in the veld. Will Champion is dressed as Snorky from the fictional band The Banana Splits, identifiable by his glasses and polka-dot ears. He starts playing with them, and the band eventually play a sell-out stadium concert together, before returning to the veld where they run towards the camera. The video was shot on location in London, Cape Town, the Klein Karoo in the Western Cape and Johannesburg. The zoo that Martin escapes from is Paradise Wildlife Park in Broxbourne, Hertfordshire. The bike shop shown is Woodstock Cycleworks in Woodstock, Cape Town. The concert segment was filmed during Coldplay's Mylo Xyloto Tour concert at the FNB Stadium on 8 October 2011. After performing this song live, the band donned their elephant heads and gloves and pretended to perform as the last minute of the studio recording played. The concertgoers were encouraged to cheer and sing along as if they were actually performing. As of August 2021, the video has over 1.48 billion views on YouTube.

Another music video was directed by Shynola, who had directed the video for "Strawberry Swing". The video was intended as the first incarnation for the video before the band came up with the elephant concept. The promo pictures the life of a little girl that comes out from jail. A special video of "Paradise" was created for the 2012 Summer Paralympics and shown between event breaks. This version featured clips of Paralympian Athletes competing in events.

Track listing

Remixes

Personnel 
Chris Martin – lead and backing vocals, piano
Jonny Buckland – guitar, keyboard, backing vocals
Guy Berryman – bass guitar, backing vocals
Will Champion – drums, backing vocals
Brian Eno – synthesizers
Davide Rossi – strings

Cover versions 
 On 8 November 2011, an a capella version of the song was released by musician Mike Tompkins on his YouTube channel.
 An acoustic version of the song was released by singer Tyler Ward on his YouTube channel on 15 December 2011.
 Crossover band The Piano Guys released an African version of "Paradise" (titled "Peponi" which is Swahili for paradise) featuring singer Alex Boyé on their official YouTube channel on 9 January 2012. It quickly went viral, with over 80 million views as of July 2020.
 Violinist David Garrett played the song at a concert in Hanover on 18 October 2014.

Charts

Weekly charts

Year-end charts

Decade-end charts

Certifications

Release history

References

External links
 

2010s ballads
2011 singles
2011 songs
Coldplay songs
Rock ballads
Songs written by Jonny Buckland
Songs written by Guy Berryman
Songs written by Will Champion
Songs written by Brian Eno
Songs written by Chris Martin
Song recordings produced by Brian Eno
Song recordings produced by Markus Dravs
Song recordings produced by Rik Simpson
Number-one singles in Norway
Number-one singles in Scotland
UK Singles Chart number-one singles
Parlophone singles
Capitol Records singles
Music videos directed by Mat Whitecross